Chimoré Municipality is the fourth municipal section of the Carrasco Province in the Cochabamba Department, Bolivia. Its seat is Chimoré.

This municipality was created in 1984 by Law number 633 of September 13, 1984, encompassing the towns of San Isidro, Senda III, La Victoria, Santa Rosa, Todos Santos, Puerto Alegre, Entre Rios Tacuaral, Puerto Aurora, Senda F, Senda D, Senda B y Cesarzama.

It is bordered by the rivers Ichilo, Chimoré and Chapare.

Subdivision 
The municipality consists of only one canton, Chimoré Canton. It is identical to the municipality.

The people 
The people are predominantly indigenous citizens of Quechuan descent. There are also groups of Yuracaré along Chapare River like in the communities of Ibare, Puerto Cochabamba and Nueva Esperanza.

Languages 
The languages spoken in the municipality are mainly Spanish and Quechua.

References 

 Instituto Nacional de Estadistica de Bolivia

External links 
 Population data and map of Chimoré Municipality

Municipalities of the Cochabamba Department